Viscount  was a Japanese daimyō of the late Edo period who served as daimyō of Shishido han. Retiring early, he was succeeded by his son Matsudaira Yorinori, but Yoritaka returned to headship following Yorinori's death in 1864. Though the domain was abolished following its involvement in the chaos of the  revolt of 1864, the new Satsuma-Chōshu centered government of the Meiji Emperor forgave Shishido, and allowed Yoritaka to retake his former holdings. Becoming han chiji (domainal governor) by Imperial order in 1869, he remained in that position until the abolition of the domains in 1871. After that he became a Shinto priest and was famed as a prolific writer. His son  succeeded him as family head in 1880.

Yoritaka died in December 1886, at age 76.

Ancestry
 

|-

References

External links
Biographical information
More information

1810 births
1886 deaths
Daimyo
Japanese writers
Kannushi
Kazoku
Meiji Restoration
Japanese Shintoists
Mitorenshi-Matsudaira clan